WLCK (1250 AM) is a radio station  broadcasting a Southern Gospel format. Licensed to Scottsville, Kentucky, United States, the station serves the Bowling Green area.  The station is currently owned by Skytower Communications Group, LLC and features programming from Salem Communications.

References

External links

Southern Gospel radio stations in the United States
LCK
Scottsville, Kentucky